Craig Smith may refer to:

Sports
Craig Smith (Australian rules footballer) (born 1967), former Australian rules footballer 
Craig Smith (rugby league, born 1971), New Zealand rugby league player
Craig Smith (rugby league, born 1973), Australian rugby league player
 Craig Smith (1990s rugby league), Australian rugby league player
Craig Smith (rugby union) (born 1978), Scottish rugby union player for Edinburgh and Scotland
Craig Smith (basketball, born 1972) (born 1972), American basketball coach
Craig Smith (basketball, born 1983) (born 1983), American basketball player
Craig Mackail-Smith (born 1984), footballer for Brighton & Hove Albion
Craig Smith (cricketer) (born 1985), New Zealand cricketer
Craig Smith (ice hockey) (born 1989), American ice hockey player

Other
 Craig Smith (musician) (1945–2012), American musician and songwriter
 Craig Warren Smith (born 1946), expert on business and government relations in high tech industry
 Craig Smith (conductor) (1947–2007), American conductor
 Craig S. Smith (born 1955), American journalist
 Craig T. Smith, former White House political director
 Roger Craig Smith (born 1975), voice actor
 Craig R. Smith, MD - (b. 1948), American physician and Surgeon-in-Chief of NewYork-Presbyterian Hospital / Columbia University Medical Center who personally performed President Bill Clintons 2004 quadruple heart bypass